Helvetic Wings was a short-lived Swiss airline based in Geneva.

History
The airline was established by Twin Jet in October 2003 and started operations on 21 June 2004. It ceased operations on October 11, 2004, but depending on the success of future financial investment, hoped to restart services which however never materialized.

Fleet
Helvetic Wings operated Raytheon Beech 1900C Airliner aircraft.

References

Defunct airlines of Switzerland
Airlines established in 2003
Airlines disestablished in 2004
Swiss companies disestablished in 2004
Swiss companies established in 2003